Josephine Fagan was an American politician from Lusk, Wyoming who served a single term in the Wyoming House of Representatives. She was elected in 1932, and represented Niobrara County from 1933 to 1935 as a Democrat in the 22nd Wyoming Legislature. Fagan represented Niobrara County alongside Dan Hanson.

Fagan was married to Thomas M. Fagan, who previously represented Niobrara County in the Wyoming House of Representatives from 1925 to 1927 as a Democrat in the 18th legislature.

See also
Thomas M. Fagan, Fagan's husband, who also represented Niobrara County as a Democrat in the Wyoming House of Representatives

Notes

References

External links
Official page at the Wyoming Legislature

Year of birth missing
Year of death missing
20th-century American women politicians
Democratic Party members of the Wyoming House of Representatives
Women state legislators in Wyoming
People from Lusk, Wyoming